Frio Peak is a peak  high located  east of Salient Peak on Salient Ridge, in the Royal Society Range, Victoria Land, Antarctica. 

The name was suggested by K. Brodie, a member of R.H. Findlay's New Zealand Antarctic Research Program field party, 1979–80. "Frio" is a Spanish word for cold and commemorates work conducted in the area in 1979 in piercing cold wind.

References

Mountains of Victoria Land
Scott Coast